Bešenovo is a village in Serbia. It is located in the Sremska Mitrovica municipality, in the Syrmia District, Vojvodina province. The village has a Serb ethnic majority and the population numbers 965 people (2002 census). Near the village is Bešenovo monastery, one of 16 Serb Orthodox monasteries on the Fruška Gora mountain.

Name
In Serbian, the village is known as Bešenovo (Бешеново), in Croatian as Bešenovo, and in Hungarian as Besenyő.

Demographic history
1961: 1,312
1971: 1,313
1981: 1,028
1991: 913
2002: 965

See also

Bešenovo monastery
List of places in Serbia
List of cities, towns and villages in Vojvodina

References
Slobodan Ćurčić, Broj stanovnika Vojvodine, Novi Sad, 1996.

Populated places in Syrmia
Sremska Mitrovica